Hildegunn Gjertrud Hovdenak (born 11 August 1985) is a Norwegian professional racing cyclist. She won the Norwegian National Road Race Championship in 2012.

References

External links

1985 births
Living people
Norwegian female cyclists
Place of birth missing (living people)